The 1939 South African Grand Prix was a voiturette race held at the Prince George Circuit on 2 January 1939.

Classification

South African Grand Prix
Grand Prix
South African Grand Prix
January 1939 sports events